Shuishu may refer to:
 Shuǐshū (水书), the Chinese name for a writing system used by the Sui people
 Shūi Wakashū, an imperial anthology of Japanese waka